"Pineapple Princess" is an American pop song made popular by Annette Funicello in the summer of 1960. "Pineapple Princess" was written by the Sherman Brothers. It appeared on the LP album, Hawaiiannette.

Chart performance
As a single, it reached the top 15 in the three major US trade publications: Billboard, Cash Box, and Music Vendor, peaking at number eleven on the Hot 100.

Cover versions
In 1964, the Quinto Sisters recorded the song as a single for Columbia Records and performed it on NBC-TV for Mitch Miller’s Sing Along with Mitch.
The novelty-rock band Barnes & Barnes performed a cover of this song on their 1986 album Sicks.
In 2014, a remix of the song by Kinsey Moore was released as a part of Walt Disney Records' album, Dconstructed.

Popular culture
In The Andy Griffith Show episode "Those Gossipin' Men", Floyd the barber's nephew plays "Pineapple Princess" on his saxophone.
In Barb and Star Go to Vista Del Mar, the song is played during a montage.

References

External links
The Annette Sound
The Official Quinto Sisters Web Site

Annette Funicello songs
Disney songs
Songs written by the Sherman Brothers
1960 singles
1960 songs